Ramniklal Kirchand Gandhi was an Indian pediatric surgeon, medical academic, writer and the president of the Association of Surgeons of India. Born in a Jain family of modest means in Khanpur in the Kumaon region of the Indian state of Uttar Pradesh on 18 January 1929, he did his schooling at Rajkot and graduated in medicine from the King Edward Memorial Hospital and Seth Gordhandas Sunderdas Medical College, Mumbai with first rank. He did his post graduation at the same institute in pediatric surgery while practicing medicine.

Gandhi was the president of the Association of Surgeons of India and was the editorial secretary or editor of the Indian Journal of Surgery from 1965 to 1989. He was an honorary fellow of the Royal College of Surgeons of Edinburgh and was the co-author of the book, G. D. Adhia's Operative Surgery and Instruments, published in 1983. The Government of India awarded him the fourth highest Indian civilian honour of Padma Shri in 1985.

He died on 14 June 2003, at the age of 74, survived by his wife, Madhu.

See also

 King Edward Memorial Hospital and Seth Gordhandas Sunderdas Medical College

References

Recipients of the Padma Shri in medicine
1929 births
2003 deaths
People from Almora district
Medical doctors from Uttarakhand
Indian paediatric surgeons
Indian medical academics
Indian medical writers
Fellows of the Royal College of Surgeons of Edinburgh
20th-century surgeons